Macken (Swedish slang for The Filling Station) was a Swedish six-part musical sitcom that ran on SVT in 1986. It was produced by Galenskaparna och After Shave and was a major breakthrough for the group. The programmes were built up from a series of sketches, sometimes with comedy or satirical elements.

Some of the songs from the show became hits on Svensktoppen, and the series was adapted into a 1990 film, Macken – Roy's & Roger's Bilservice. The series was also adapted to a play, Macken – TV-serien på scen, in 2016.

Story 
The story centres around the two brothers Roy and Roger who own a small car garage and adjoining self-service petrol station, with associated shop, in Västergötland (an old garage in Vara was used as the outside location in the 1990 movie).

The bulk of the show involves the eccentric customers that the pair have to deal with. There are also three subplots, where the local authority wants to demolish the garage to build a new motorway; where an annoyed customer keeps returning to collect his white Opel, after a service, but Roy and Roger are unable to find the car; and where a very timid, beige-clothed man keeps parking his blue Volvo 240 outside the garage, much to Roy's annoyance, but is too nervous to ever actually approach Roy or Roger.

Production 
The show was shot completely in the studio with no exterior shots. The setting never moves from the interior of the station and aside from a small glimpse when Roy opens the backdoor you never see how the outside looks.

In other media 
The television series was adapted into a film, Macken – Roy's & Roger's Bilservice, in 1990.

In 2016, the television series was adapted into a stage play, Macken – TV-serien på scen. , the play is still touring the country, largely with the original cast. The script is almost identical to the original television screenplay.

References

External links
 Original Macken episodes, at Öppet arkiv

1986 Swedish television series debuts
Galenskaparna och After Shave
1990s musical comedy films
Musical comedy plays
Musical comedy television shows
Sveriges Television comedy shows
Swedish television sitcoms
Swedish comedy films
Swedish musicals
Västergötland
1990 films
2016 musicals
Skaraborg
Swedish satirical television shows
Surreal comedy television series
Swedish surrealist artists
1990 comedy films
1990s Swedish films